Roman Ječmínek (born 12 May 1967) is a Czech fencer. He competed in the épée events at the 1992 and 1996 Summer Olympics.

References

1967 births
Living people
Czech male fencers
Czechoslovak male fencers
Olympic fencers of Czechoslovakia
Olympic fencers of the Czech Republic
Fencers at the 1992 Summer Olympics
Fencers at the 1996 Summer Olympics
Sportspeople from Prague